Bernd Rasing (born 13 February 1949) is a German racing cyclist. He rode in the 1972 Tour de France.

References

External links
 

1949 births
Living people
German male cyclists
Place of birth missing (living people)
Sportspeople from Münster
Cyclists from North Rhine-Westphalia